The Adena mound, the type site for the Adena culture of prehistoric mound builders, is a registered historic structure, on the grounds of the Adena Mansion for which it is named, near Chillicothe, Ohio.  It was listed in the National Register on June 5, 1975.

Historic uses 
 Graves/burials

See also
Adena culture

References

External links

Adena culture
Archaeological sites in Ohio
Chillicothe, Ohio
Archaeological sites on the National Register of Historic Places in Ohio
Archaeological type sites
Geography of Ross County, Ohio
Mounds in Ohio
National Register of Historic Places in Ross County, Ohio